Harold Saxon-Snell (1889–1956) was a British stage and film actor. He appeared in twenty-three films during the silent and early sound eras. He is often credited as H. Saxon-Snell or Harold Snell. He and actress Kathleen Boutall married in 1922.

Filmography

 Eugene Aram (1914)
 The Man Who Bought London (1916)
 The Luck of the Navy (1927)
 Smashing Through (1928)
 The Bondman (1929)
 A Peep Behind the Scenes (1929)
 The Clue of the New Pin (1929)
 The Loves of Robert Burns (1930)
 Deadlock (1931)
 Josser Joins the Navy (1932)
 My Friend the King (1932)
 Verdict of the Sea (1932)
 The Return of Raffles (1932)
 Maid Happy (1933)
 The Love Wager (1933)
 Murder at the Inn (1934)
 The Return of Bulldog Drummond (1934)
 His Majesty and Company (1935)
 Radio Pirates (1935)
 Rolling Home (1935)
 Once in a New Moon (1935)
 Abdul the Damned (1935)
 Royal Cavalcade (1935)

References

Bibliography

External links

1889 births
1956 deaths
English male film actors
English male stage actors
English male silent film actors
20th-century English male actors
Male actors from London